Sultana is a census-designated place in Tulare County, California, United States. Sultana has a post office with ZIP code 93666. The population was 775 at the 2010 census.

Geography
According to the United States Census Bureau, the CDP covers an area of 0.4 square miles (1.1 km), all of it land.

Demographics
At the 2010 census Sultana had a population of 775. The racial makeup of Sultana was 315 (40.6%) White, 0 (0.0%) African American, 3 (0.4%) Native American, 6 (0.8%) Asian, 0 (0.0%) Pacific Islander, 424 (54.7%) from other races, and 27 (3.5%) from two or more races. Hispanic or Latino of any race were 695 people (89.7%).

The whole population lived in households, no one lived in non-institutionalized group quarters and no one was institutionalized.

There were 220 households, 125 (56.8%) had children under the age of 18 living in them, 109 (49.5%) were opposite-sex married couples living together, 36 (16.4%) had a female householder with no husband present, 20 (9.1%) had a male householder with no wife present.  There were 21 (9.5%) unmarried opposite-sex partnerships, and 0 (0%) same-sex married couples or partnerships. 40 households (18.2%) were one person and 12 (5.5%) had someone living alone who was 65 or older. The average household size was 3.52.  There were 165 families (75.0% of households); the average family size was 4.12.

The age distribution was 298 people (38.5%) under the age of 18, 72 people (9.3%) aged 18 to 24, 211 people (27.2%) aged 25 to 44, 131 people (16.9%) aged 45 to 64, and 63 people (8.1%) who were 65 or older.  The median age was 27.1 years. For every 100 females, there were 102.3 males.  For every 100 females age 18 and over, there were 104.7 males.

There were 242 housing units at an average density of 545.3 per square mile, of the occupied units 75 (34.1%) were owner-occupied and 145 (65.9%) were rented. The homeowner vacancy rate was 4.9%; the rental vacancy rate was 3.2%.  254 people (32.8% of the population) lived in owner-occupied housing units and 521 people (67.2%) lived in rental housing units.

References

Census-designated places in Tulare County, California
Census-designated places in California